Stephen Yoakam is an actor who has appeared in several motion pictures and television movies. He also guest starred in the Star Trek: Deep Space Nine episodes "When It Rains..." and "The Dogs of War" as the Romulan Subcommander/General Velal.

Yoakam often narrates productions of Peer Gynt with the Minnesota Orchestra. He has been a member of the acting company of the Guthrie Theatre for over 20 years.

Partial filmography

External links

Notes and references

American male film actors
American male television actors
American male stage actors
American male voice actors
Living people
Date of birth missing (living people)
Place of birth missing (living people)
Year of birth missing (living people)